Conisania is a genus of moths of the family Noctuidae.

Species
 Conisania agrotoides Hacker & Speidel, 1992
 Conisania albina (Staudinger, 1896)
 Conisania andalusica (Staudinger, 1859)
 Conisania arida (Lederer, 1855)
 Conisania arterialis (Draudt, 1936)
 Conisania capsivora (Draudt, 1933)
 Conisania cervina (Eversmann, 1842)
 Conisania clara Ronkay, Varga & Gyulai, 1997
 Conisania dentirena Ronkay, Varga & Gyulai, 1997
 Conisania egenoides Boursin, 1966
 Conisania euxoides Hreblay & Ronkay, 1999
 Conisania evestigata (Draudt, 1936)
 Conisania hadulina (Draudt, 1934)
 Conisania lahoulicola Harcke & Varga, 1990
 Conisania leineri (Freyer, 1836)
 Conisania leuconephra (Draudt, 1950)
 Conisania literata (Fischer de Waldheim, 1840)
 Conisania luteago (Denis & Schiffermüller, 1775)
 Conisania mienshani (Draudt, 1950)
 Conisania oxyptera Gyulai & Varga, 1998
 Conisania poelli Stertz, 1915
 Conisania renati (Oberthür, 1890)
 Conisania ronkayi Yoshimoto, 1998
 Conisania roseipicta (Draudt, 1950)
 Conisania suaveola (Draudt, 1950)
 Conisania suavis (Staudinger, 1892)
 Conisania vargai Hreblay & Ronkay, 1999
 Conisania verhulsti Gyulai & Ronkay, 1995
 Conisania vidua (Staudinger, 1888)
 Conisania xanthothrix Boursin, 1960

References
 Conisania at Markku Savela's Lepidoptera and Some Other Life Forms
 Natural History Museum Lepidoptera genus database

Hadenini